M. Karnan (c. 1933 – 13 December 2012) was an Indian cinematographer and director who mainly worked in Tamil cinema. Starting his career as an assistant to V. Ramamurthi, Karnan gradually rose to a full-fledged cinematographer, and made a few films based on curry western featuring Jaishankar in the lead. In an interview to Behindwoods, cinematographer Ravi K. Chandran mentioned Karnan as an inspiration and noted the way he made films. He had a very good heart and he was a pure soul . He had helped many in his times. After prolonged illness, he died on 13 December 2012.

Filmography 
Director
Kalam Vellum (1970)
Ganga (1972)
Jakkamma (1972)
Enga Pattan Sothu (1975)
Ore Thanthai (1976)
Edharkum Thunindhavan (1976)
Jamboo (1980)
Pudhiya Thoranangal (1980)
Avanukku Nigar Avane (1982)
Sattathukku Oru Saval (1983)
Idhu Engal Bhoomi (1984)
Aandavan Sothu (1985)
Jansi Rani (1985)
Karuppu Sattaikaran (1985)
 Vettai Puli  (1986)
Rettai Kuzhal Thuppakki (1989)
Nallathai Naadu Kekum (1991)

Cinematographer
Sabaash Meena (1958)
President Panchatcharam (1959)
Kadavulin Kuzhandhai (1960)
Sangilithevan (1960)
Thangarathinam (1960)
Deivathin Deivam (1962)
Sarada (1962)
Karpagam (1963)
Kai Kodutha Deivam (1964)
Anandhi (1965)
Neela Vaanam (1965)
Kalyana Mandapam (1965)
Thenmazhai (1966)
Naam Moovar (1966)
Uyir Mel Aasai (1967)
Andru Kanda Mugam (1968)
Nirai Kudam (1969)
Thirumagal (1971)
Veettuku Veedu (1970)
Madhuraiyai Meetta Sundharapandiyan (1978)
Polladhavan (1980)
Keezh Vaanam Sivakkum (1981)
Simla Special (1982)
Paritchaikku Neramaachu (1982)
Sivappu Sooriyan (1983)
Iru Medhaigal (1984)

References

External links 
 

Indian film directors
Tamil film cinematographers
Tamil film directors
1933 births
2012 deaths
20th-century Indian photographers
20th-century Indian film directors